The 1994 Michigan Wolverines football team represented the University of Michigan in the 1994 NCAA Division I-A football season. Led by Gary Moeller in his last season as head coach, the Wolverines participated in the Holiday Bowl.

Season

Schedule

Roster

Rankings

Game summaries

Boston College

Sixteen seconds into the game, the #5 ranked Wolverines found themselves down 7-0 on a Mike Hartsell 74 yard TD pass to Greg Grice. BC stretched it to 12-0, before Michigan began to rally. Ed Davis scored from 4 yards out to cut the lead, then Todd Collins hit Amani Toomer from 54 yards out to give the Wolverines a 14-12 lead at halftime. Collins and Toomer hooked up again in the 3rd quarter to stretch the lead to 21-12, then Davis and Tim Biakabutuka added touchdown runs to give Michigan a 34-12 lead, and the Wolverines held on after BC scored late to make the final 34-26. Collins completed 17 of 24 passes for 258 yards, 2 touchdowns and 1 interception. Toomer caught 7 passes for 179 yards and running back Tim Biakabutuka rushed for 128 yards and a touchdown on 12 carries.

at Notre Dame

    
    
    
    
    
    
    
    
    
    

In a back and forth game, Remy Hamilton kicked a 42 yard field goal with 2 seconds left to give #6 Michigan a 26-24 victory over #3 Notre Dame at South Bend. Hamilton finished with 4 field goals on the day. Tim Biakabutuka scored from 9 yards out and Jay Riemersma caught a 3 yard TD pass from Todd Collins for Michigan’s points. Notre Dame had taken the lead with 52 seconds left, then Collins led the Wolverines into position for Hamilton’s winning kick. Biakabutuka finished with 100 yards rushing and Collins completed 21 of 29 passes for 224 yards.
"I'm a hero now. I could be a goat next week." -Remy Hamilton

Colorado

Colorado trailed Michigan 26–21 with six seconds left when Stewart heaved the ball more than 70 yards in the air into the end zone where Michael Westbrook caught it on a planned deflection from Blake Anderson for the game winning touchdown. The play, which was named "Rocket Left", was called by Bill McCartney, Colorado coach and former Michigan assistant coach. Westbrook, Anderson and Rae Carruth lined up wide left and James Kidd lined up wide right. The same play was called to end the first half, resulting in a Chuck Winters interception. The game was decided on Colorado quarterback Kordell Stewart's 64-yard Hail Mary pass to Westbrook, the second touchdown by the Buffaloes in the last 2:16. It was one of the wildest finishes in Michigan football history. Tim Biakabutuka and Tyrone Wheatley each ran for a touchdown and Todd Collins completed 17 of 24 passes for 258 yards and a TD pass to Amani Toomer.

at Iowa

Remy Hamilton kicked three field goals and Tyrone Wheatley rushed for 182 yards with two touchdowns as #7 Michigan pulled away late and beat the Hawkeyes, 29-14, at Nile Kinnick Stadium. The Wolverine defense held Iowa to 84 yards rushing and Steve Morrison had 14 tackles and an interception to lead the defense. Amani Toomer caught 5 passes for 93 yards and Tim Biakabatuka added a touchdown run.

Michigan State
Remy Hamilton kicked 4 field goals and Tyrone Wheatley rushed for 153 yards and two touchdowns while Tim Biakabutuka added 141 yards and a touchdown to lead the #7 ranked Wolverines to a 40-20 victory over Michigan State at Michigan Stadium. Todd Collins completed 16 of 23 passes for 211 yards and a TD pass to Wheatley. Mercury Hayes caught 4 passes for 96 yards. The Michigan defense held the Spartans to 17 yards rushing.

Penn State

The #3 ranked Nittany Lions held a 16-3 halftime lead on three Brett Conway field goals and a Kerry Collins to Keith Olsommer TD pass, but had to come from behind to beat #5 Michigan, 31-24, at Michigan Stadium. Tyrone Wheatley had touchdown runs of 67 and 21 yards to forge ahead 17-16. Penn State responded with a Jon Wittman 9 yard TD pass from Collins who then threw to Freddie Scott for a 2 point conversion to take the lead, 24-17. The Wolverines tied the game on a Tim Biakabutuka 1 yard run with just under 12 minutes left. With just under 3 minutes left, Collins hit Bobby Engram with a 16 yard scoring strike to put the Nittany Lions ahead for good, 31-24. Brian Miller picked off a Todd Collins pass with 1:26 left to seal the victory. Wheatley finished with 144 yards rushing and Todd Collins completed 14 of 24 passes for 221 yards.

at Illinois
Despite outgaining Illinois by over a 100 yards, #11 Michigan had to hold on for a 19-14 victory over the Fighting Illini at Champaign. Remy Hamilton kicked 4 field goals and Amani Toomer returned a punt 72 yards for a touchdown in the 3rd quarter that was the difference in the game. The Wolverines dominated in time of possession with a 37:00-23:00 minute advantage.

Wisconsin
Brent Moss ran for 106 yards which opened things up for Darrell Bevell, who was 18 for 26 for 161 yards passing and 3 touchdowns, as the Badgers upset Michigan, 31-19. It was the Badgers' first victory at Ann Arbor since 1962. The Badger defense had three interceptions and three sacks against #10 ranked Michigan. Todd Collins completed 14 of 25 for 172 yards passing with a touchdown and 2 interceptions. Tyrone Wheatley ran for 132 yards and a touchdown, but it wasn’t enough to offset the Badgers dominance in time of possession.

at Purdue
Tyrone Wheatley rushed for 148 yards and two touchdowns, Tim Biakabutuka rushed for 100 yards and a touchdown as #20 Michigan earned a 45-23 victory over the Boilermakers at Ross-Ade Stadium. Ed Davis added a touchdown run and Todd Collins completed 15 of 18 passes for 191 yards with two touchdown passes, one to Pierre Cooper and one to Che Foster. Rob Sweet had an interception to lead the defense.

Minnesota
Michigan trailed 15-10 at halftime, but exploded for 18 third quarter points to pull away and defeat the Golden Gophers, 38-22 and retain the Little Brown Jug for another year. Todd Collins led the way as he completed 15 of 27 passes for 352 yards and three touchdown passes. Amani Toomer caught 6 passes for 147 yards and two TD receptions. Tyrone Wheatley ran for a touchdown and caught a TD pass from Collins. Remy Hamilton kicked three field goals to round out the Wolverines scoring.

at Ohio State

The #15 ranked Wolverines trailed 12-3 at halftime and never could recover as the #22 Buckeyes knocked off Michigan, 22-6. The Buckeyes went up 12-0 on a safety, a Bobby Hoying 5 yard TD run and a Josh Jackson 25 yard field goal. Remy Hamilton kicked his 2nd field goal in the 3rd quarter to cut the lead to 12-6 going into the final 15 minutes. Jackson kicked a 36 yard field goal, then Luke Fickell intercepted a Todd Collins pass and Eddie George added a 2 yard touchdown run for the final points to seal the win. Michigan was held to 111 yards on the ground.

1994 Holiday Bowl

CSU nearly mirrored the Wolverines in total yardage (341-340), but gained just 51 yards rushing against a Michigan defense that forced four turnovers and had a key goal line stand in the second half. Michigan struck first on the game's opening drive on Todd Collins' four yard TD pass to Amam Toomer with 8:51 left in the opening quarter The Rams took the ensuing kickoff and turned in a nine play, 66 yard drive to tie the game, 7-7. The drive was culminated by Paul Turner's 32 yard TD reception. All-American Remy Hamilton booted a 34 yard field goal with 2:46 remaining in the first quarter to put Michigan ahead 10-7. A blocked punt by freshman Chris Howard gave Michigan the ball deep in Rams territory with less than two minutes left before halftime. Collins then connected with Mercury Hayes for a 16 yard TD strike to put MICHIGAN ahead 17-7 with 1:28 left in the half. The Wolverines forced a turnover on CSU's first drive of the second half, taking over on the Rams' 17 yard line. Tyrone Wheatley made short work four plays later with a three yard plunge into the endzone. That gave Michigan a 7 lead with 11:58 left in the third quarter. Midway through the third quarter, a 42 yard pass play helped CSU move the ball from its own 13 yard line to inside the Wolverine 10. A pair of pass interference calls against Michigan gave the Rams seven plays to attempt to go eight yards into the end zone. Four plays from the Michigan two yard line turned up nothing for Colorado State, as a two yard loss and incomplete pass on fourth down helped the Wolverines turn away the high-scoring Rains. Michigan held a 24-7 advantage after three quarters and held that lead until 1:18 remained in the game. CSU finally cracked the stubborn Michigan defense with an 18 yard TD pass by Anthony Hill to complete the scoring. Collins threw for 162 yards (14 for 24) and two touchdowns, earning the game's offensive MVP honors. The Michigan defense tallied 11 tackles for loss, driving the CSU offense back 61 yards.

Statistical achievements
Remy Hamilton established the current Big Ten single-season record, which has since been tied three times, for successful field goals at 25. He won the NCAA statistical championship for field goal kickers. Amani Toomer won the Big Ten receiving yardage champion for all games with 91.3 yards per game and the conference games yardage championship with an 87.9 average.

The team earned the fourth of five consecutive and six 1990s Big Ten rushing defense statistical championships for conference games by holding opponents to 112.3 yards per game. However, Illinois won the title for all games.

Tyrone Wheatley ended his career as the school record holder for 100-yard games with 20, surpassing Jamie Morris' 18 set in 1987. Anthony Thomas broke this record when his career ended in 2000. Todd Collins ended his career by surpassing Elvis Grbac's 62.5 career completion percentage record with a 64.3 percentage to establish the current record; tying Grbac's 23 150-yard game total, which was eclipsed by John Navarre in 2003; and surpassing Jim Harbaugh's 12 career 200-yard game total set in 1986 with 14, which was surpassed by Tom Brady in 1999. His 352-yard passing performance on November 12 against Minnesota, which surpassed Harbaugh's 1986 310-yard performance, was a school record that stood for a year until surpassed by Scott Dreisbach. Amani Toomer broke Jack Clancy's single-season reception yard record of 1077 set in 1966, but David Terrell eclipsed this mark in 2000.

Team players drafted into the NFL
The following players were claimed in the 1995 NFL Draft.

Awards and honors
Co-captains: Steve Morrison, Walter Smith
All-Americans: Remy Hamilton, Ty Law
All-Conference: Tyrone Wheatley, Ty Law, Remy Hamilton, Steve Morrison, Amani Toomer, Jason Horn
Most Valuable Player: Todd Collins
Meyer Morton Award: Jay Riemersma
John Maulbetsch Award: Rob Swett
Frederick Matthei Award: Rob Swett
Arthur Robinson Scholarship Award: Todd Collins
Dick Katcher Award: Trent Zenkewicz
Hugh Rader Jr. Award: Jon Runyan
Robert P. Ufer Award: Ed Davis
Roger Zatkoff Award: Steve Morrison

Coaching staff
Head coach: Gary Moeller
Assistant coaches: Lloyd Carr, Kit Cartwright, Mike DeBord, Bill Harris, Jim Herrmann, Fred Jackson, Greg Mattison, Les Miles, Bobby Morrison
Trainer: Paul Schmidt
Managers: Andy Riegler, Joe Allore, Jason Armstrong, Adam Bahr, Kevin Bickner, Patrick Bolger, Joel Gerring, Eddie Magnus, Marty Rice, Sami Samaha

References

External links
  1994 Football Team -- Bentley Historical Library, University of Michigan Athletics History

Michigan
Michigan Wolverines football seasons
Holiday Bowl champion seasons
Michigan Wolverines football